Maryna Pryshchepa (Ukrainian: Марина Прищепа; born 28 July 1983 in Kiev, Ukrainian SSR, Soviet Union) is a Ukrainian judoka.

Career
She competed at the 2008 Summer Olympics (Beijing) in the -78 kg event and lost her opening match to Heide Wollert. Four years later in London, she participated in the -78 kg tournament of the 2012 Summer Olympics and was eliminated in her first match by Audrey Tcheuméo of France.

Pryshchepa won a silver medal at the 2009 World Judo Championships. She also has a silver medal (2009) and four bronze medals (2006, 2007, 2010, 2012) at the European Judo Championships.

Pryshchepa is also competing in sambo and sumo. She is a world sambo champion. Since 2008 Pryshchepa has been representing Ukraine in sumo. She won two medals in sumo at the World Games.

References

External links
 

1983 births
Living people
Ukrainian female judoka
Ukrainian sumo wrestlers
Sportspeople from Kyiv
Olympic judoka of Ukraine
Judoka at the 2008 Summer Olympics
Judoka at the 2012 Summer Olympics
World Games gold medalists
World Games silver medalists
Competitors at the 2009 World Games
Competitors at the 2013 World Games
Kyiv National University of Trade and Economics alumni
21st-century Ukrainian women